Rhythm Heaven Fever, known in PAL regions as Beat The Beat: Rhythm Paradise, Minna No Rhythm Tengoku in Japan and Rhythm World Wii in Korea, is a Japanese music video game developed by Nintendo and TNX for Nintendo's Wii. It is the third game in the Rhythm Heaven series, following Rhythm Tengoku for the Game Boy Advance and Rhythm Heaven for the Nintendo DS, and was succeeded by Rhythm Heaven Megamix for the Nintendo 3DS in 2016. The game was released in Japan on July 21, 2011, in North America on February 13, 2012, in Europe on July 6, 2012, and in Australia on September 13, 2012. It was digitally re-released for the Wii U in Japan on July 27, 2016, in North America on November 10, 2016, and in Europe on November 22, 2016.

Gameplay
As with Rhythm Tengoku and its DS sequel, Rhythm Heaven Fever features various levels with their own set of rules, requiring the player to play in time to the rhythm in order to clear them. These levels range from stabbing peas with a fork, to attacking evil spirits with a sword, and playing badminton in midair. The game is played by either tapping the A button, or squeezing the A and B buttons together. At the end of each level, players are ranked on their performance, with at least an 'OK' rank required to clear the level and progress onto the next. Each set of levels culminates in a Remix stage, which combines all of the gameplay elements of the previous levels in one stage.

Clearing levels with a Superb rating earns medals that unlock extra content, including Rhythm Toys, Endless Games and four levels from the original Rhythm Tengoku, plus a bonus credits level. Levels that have been cleared with a Superb rating may also be randomly selected for a Perfect attempt, in which the player can try to clear the level without making any mistakes with a maximum of 3 retries before the perfect challenge disappears. Clearing these unlock bonus items such as songs and lyrics. The game also features a Dual Mode in which two players can play simultaneously. Levels played in this mode require players to earn enough points in total to reach the desired rank and clear each stage, with bonus points awarded based on the harmony of the players that can improve the rank. These levels come with their own set of medals which can unlock multiplayer minigames.

Development
Producer Yoshio Sakamoto and Nintendo SPD Group No.1 were responsible for the programming, graphic design, and some of the music in the game. The development team made some prototypes using 3D models, however, they felt that the flow of the games worked best with 2D animation. Motion controls were also ignored in favor of more accurate button controls.

Collaborator and musician Tsunku and his music studio TNX created several of the performed vocal songs found throughout the game. These songs are "Tonight" (used in Remix 3), "Lonely Storm" (used in Karate Man, with a remixed version used in its sequel), "Dreams of Our Generation" (used in Night Walk), "I Love You, My One and Only" (used in Remix 8), and "Beautiful One Day" (used in Remix 9), all performed by Mana Ogawa, Soshi, Nice Girl Trainee, The Possible, and Canary Club respectively. For the English version, these songs were re-recorded by Annette Marie Cotrill, Aimee Blackschelger, and Clinton Edward Strother. Soundtrack albums for the game were only released in Japan. The first has all of the music from the game, which was released on August 24, 2011, and the second has the vocal songs used in the game, which was released on August 31, 2011.

In the English versions of the game, an endless minigame based on manzai routines was removed due to the dialogue focused nature of the game and was replaced with another minigame from Rhythm Tengoku known as "Mr. Upbeat". The European and Australian versions of the game allow players to toggle between English and Japanese voices and songs.

Reception
{{Video game reviews
| MC = 83/100
| Destruct = 9.5/10
| Edge = 8/10
| EGM = 9/10
| EuroG = 8/10
| Fam = 32/40<ref name="fam review">{{cite web |last=Gifford |first=Kevin |date=July 13, 2011 |url=http://www.1up.com/news/japan-review-check-rhythm-heaven |title=Japan Review Check: Rhythm Heaven, No More Heroes |website=1UP.com |url-status=dead |archive-url=https://web.archive.org/web/20121019205313/http://www.1up.com/news/japan-review-check-rhythm-heaven |archive-date=October 19, 2012 }}</ref>
| GI = 8.5/10
| GameRev = 
| GSpot = 8/10
| GT = 8.6/10
| GB = 
| Hyper = 8/10
| IGN = 7/10
| Joystiq = 
| NP = 8/10
| rev1 = Digital Spy
| rev1Score = 
| rev2 = Wired| rev2Score = 
}}
The game received "favorable" reviews according to the review aggregation website Metacritic. In Japan, Famitsu'' gave it a score of one nine, two eights, and one seven for a total of 32 out of 40, and it sold over 100,000 copies in its first week there.

Notes

References

External links
  [Archive]
 

2011 video games
Multiplayer and single-player video games
Rhythm Heaven
Video games developed in Japan
Wii games
Wii U games
Wii games re-released on the Nintendo eShop
Music video games
Rhythm games